Li Jinghong (born December 1967) is a Chinese chemist of Mongol ethnicity. He is a professor and doctoral supervisor in the Department of Chemistry, Tsinghua University.

Early life and education
Li was born in Inner Mongolia in December 1967. In September 1986 he entered the University of Science and Technology of China, where he graduated in July 1991. After graduation, he was assigned to Changchun Institute of Applied Chemistry, Chinese Academy of Sciences (CAS), where he obtained a Doctor of Science degree in December 1996. From 1997 to 2001 he was a postdoc at the University of Illinois Urbana Champaign, University of California, Santa Barbara, and Clemson University in the United States.

Career
Li returned to China in May 2001 and that same year became researcher at the Changchun Institute of Applied Chemistry, Chinese Academy of Sciences (CAS) until September 2004. In 2004 he was hired by Tsinghua University as professor and doctoral supervisor.

He is a member of the Jiusan Society. In January 2018 he became a member of the 13th National Committee of the Chinese People's Political Consultative Conference.

Honours and awards
 2001 Distinguished Young Scholar by the National Science Fund
 2006 Mao Yisheng Science and Technology Award
 2009 "Chang Jiang Scholar" (or "Yangtze River Scholar")
 2011 Basf Young Knowledge Innovation Award of Chinese Chemical Society
 Fellow of the Royal Society of Chemistry
 November 22, 2019 Member of the Chinese Academy of Sciences (CAS)

References

External links
Li Jinghong on Tsinghua University 

1967 births
Living people
University of Science and Technology of China alumni
Chemists from Inner Mongolia
Members of the Chinese Academy of Sciences
Fellows of the Royal Society of Chemistry
Chinese people of Mongolian descent
Members of the Jiusan Society